Arnold is a German and English surname. Notable people with the surname include:

A. Otis Arnold (1878–1941), American businessman and politician
Alice Arnold (disambiguation), several people
Ann Arnold (1936–2015), English artist
Bené Arnold, American dance scholar
Benedict Arnold (disambiguation), several people
Benedict Arnold (1741–1801), American Revolution general, defected to Britain
Benedict Arnold (congressman) (1780–1849), American politician from New York
Benedict Arnold (governor) (1615–1678), governor of the Rhode Island colony
Bogdan Arnold (1933–1968), Polish serial killer
Brad Arnold (born 1978), 3 Doors Down singer
Carl Arnold, American football coach
Carl Arnold (composer) (1794–1873), German composer
Catherine Arnold (born 1978), British diplomat
Cecile Arnold (1891 or 1895–1931), American silent film actress
Cedric Arnold (1907-1980), English organ-builder
Charles Arnold-Baker, English member of MI6, barrister, and historian
Clinton E. Arnold (born 1958), American New Testament scholar
Cornelius Arnold (1711–after 1757), American poetical writer
David Arnold (disambiguation), several people
Delia Arnold (born 1986), Malaysian squash player
Dominique Arnold (born 1973), American hurdling athlete
Dorothy Arnold (actress) (1917–1984), American film actress 
Douglas N. Arnold, American mathematician
Đuro Arnold (1853–1941), Croatian writer and philosopher
Dutee Arnold (1763–1849), Justice of the Rhode Island Supreme Court
Dylan Arnold (born 1994), American actor
Earl C. Arnold (d. 1949) American academic administrator
Eberhard Arnold (1883–1935), German writer, philosopher, and theologian
Eddy Arnold (1918–2008), American country music singer
Eduardo Arnold (born 1947), Argentine politician
Edward Arnold (disambiguation), several people
Sir Edwin Arnold (1832–1904), English poet and journalist
Edwin Lester Arnold (1857–1935), English author 
Elana Arnold, children's and young adult author
Elliott Arnold (1912–1980), American novelist and screenwriter
Ethel Arnold (1864 or 5 –1930), English journalist, author, and lecturer on female suffrage
Florence Arnold, English singer, songwriter and drummer, known as Florrie
Frances Arnold (born 1956), American chemical engineer and Nobel laureate 
Franck Thomas Arnold (1861–1940), Anglo-German musicologist and bibliophile
Frank Arnold (disambiguation), several people
Franz Arnold (1878–1960), Germany comedy writer
Frieda Arnold (fl. 1854–1859), British courtier, dresser (lady's maid) to Queen Victoria of Great Britain.
Friedrich Arnold (1803–1890), German anatomist
Friedrich Wilhelm Arnold (1810–1864), German musician, music seller, publisher and folk-song collector
Geoff Arnold (born 1944), English cricketer
Georg Arnold-Graboné (1896–1982), German painter and art teacher
Gillian Arnold, British artist
Godfrey Edward Arnold (1914–1989), Austrian American professor of medicine
Graham Arnold (born 1963), Australian football player and manager
Grayland Arnold (born 1997), American football player
Harriet Pritchard Arnold (1858–1901), American author
Helen Arnold, silent film actress 
Henry H. Arnold (1886–1950), American aviation pioneer and commanding general
Hollie Arnold (born 1994), British parasport athlete
Horace Lucian Arnold (died 1915), American writer on management
Ian Arnold (born 1972), English football player
Isaac N. Arnold (1815–1884), congressman during American Civil War; biographer of Abraham Lincoln
James Arnold (disambiguation), several people
Jamie Arnold (disambiguation), several people
Jay Arnold (American football) (born 1912), American football player
Jennette Arnold, Montserrat-born British politician
Jim Arnold (disambiguation), several people
Joanne Arnold (born 1931), American actress and model
Joe Arnold (born 1947), American baseball coach
John Arnold (disambiguation), several people
Johann Georg Daniel Arnold (1780–1829), German writer
Johann Gottfried Arnold (1773–1806), German cellist
Jonathan Arnold (1741–1793), American physician and statesman
Josiah D. Arnold (1820–1903), American businessman and politician
Karl Arnold (disambiguation), several people
Ken Arnold (born 1956), American computer programmer and developer of Rogue
Kenneth Arnold (1915-1984), American Aviator, noted for the first modern widely reported sighting of unidentified flying objects
Lenna Arnold (1920–2010), American baseball player
Lucas Arnold Ker (born 1974), Argentine tennis player
Luke Arnold (born 1984), Australian actor
Malcolm Arnold (1921–2006), English composer and symphonist
Marc Arnold (born 1970), South African football player
Margery Arnold (fl. mid 14th century), landowner
Martin Arnold (disambiguation), several people
Matthew Arnold (1822–1888), English poet and cultural critic
Monica (entertainer) (Monica Denise Arnold) (born 1980), American singer
Nathan Arnold (born 1987), English football player
Nicholas Arnold (disambiguation), several people
Nick Arnold (footballer) (born 1993), English football player
Nick Arnold (writer), British writer
Norbert P. Arnold (1920-–014), American politician and inventor
P. P. Arnold, American soul singer
Patricio Arnold (born 1971), Argentine tennis player
Rainer Arnold (born 1950), German politician
Richard Arnold (disambiguation), several people
Robert Arnold (disambiguation), several people
Russ Arnold, American bridge player
Russel Arnold (born 1973), Sri Lankan cricketer
Samuel Arnold (disambiguation), several people
Stanley Arnold (1903–1984), American politician
Stanley P. V. Arnold (1856–1901), American politician and newspaper editor
Tom Arnold (disambiguation), several people
Thomas Arnold (disambiguation), several people
Trent Alexander-Arnold (born 1998), English football player
Victor Arnold (disambiguation), several people
Villiers Arnold (1876–1921) actor and singer in Gilbert and Sullivan operas
Vladimir Arnold (1937–2010), Russian mathematician
Wayne Arnold  (born 1984), American basketball player
Werner Arnold (weightlifter)  (born 1931), German weightlifter
William Arnold (disambiguation), several people

See also
Arnold (disambiguation)
Arnold (given name)

References

German-language surnames
English-language surnames
Patronymic surnames
Surnames from given names